Raúl Lozano may refer to:

 Raúl Lozano (footballer) (born 1997), Argentine footballer
 Raúl Lozano (volleyball) (born 1956), Argentine volleyball player